The Balkan snow vole (Dinaromys bogdanovi), also known as Martino's snow vole, is the only member of the genus Dinaromys.  Eight subspecies of this vole have been recognized from southern parts of Europe. The genus name means "Dinaric mouse", referring to the Dinaric Alps. The Balkan snow vole is a living fossil, the only living species in the tribe Pliomyini, and might arguably better be placed in Pliomys, a genus established for its fossil relatives even before the Balkan snow vole was scientifically described.

A 2021 study found Dinaromys (and by extension, the rest of Pliomyini) to be the sister group to the tribe Ellobiusini, from which it diverged during the late Miocene; however, this still remains uncertain.

References

 

Voles and lemmings
Vole, Balkan snow
Vulnerable animals
Vulnerable biota of Europe
Mammals described in 1922
Fossils of Serbia